Oneida lunulalis, the oak gall snout moth,  is a species of snout moth in the genus Oneida. It is found in most of eastern North America, from Quebec and Ontario to Illinois and Florida.

The wingspan is about 24 mm. The forewings are silvery grey or light brown. The hindwings are grey with a white fringe. Adults are on wing from June to August.

The larvae feed on the leaves and galls on oak.

References

Moths described in 1889
Epipaschiinae